Ilya Igorevich Mudrov (born 17 November 1991) is a Russian athlete specialising in the pole vault. He competed at the 2017 World Championships in London without qualifying for the final. Additionally, he won a silver medal at the 2015 Summer Universiade.

His personal bests in the event are 5.80 metres outdoors (Moscow 2016) and 5.78 metres indoors (Malmö 2015).

International competitions

1No mark in the final

References

1991 births
Living people
People from Poshekhonsky District
Sportspeople from Yaroslavl Oblast
Russian male pole vaulters
Universiade medalists in athletics (track and field)
Universiade silver medalists for Russia
Medalists at the 2015 Summer Universiade
Russian Athletics Championships winners
Authorised Neutral Athletes at the World Athletics Championships